Lou Massenberg (born 13 November 2000) is a German diver.

He won a gold medal in the 3 m mixed synchro springboard competition at the 2018 European Aquatics Championships.

References

2000 births
Living people
German male divers
Divers at the 2018 Summer Youth Olympics
World Aquatics Championships medalists in diving
21st-century German people
Divers from Berlin